Rampur may refer to:

Places

India
 Rampur State, a princely state of British India

Uttar Pradesh
 Rampur, Uttar Pradesh, a city
 Rampur district
 Rampur (Assembly constituency)
 Rampur (Lok Sabha constituency)
 Rampur Junction railway station
 Rampur, Jaunpur district
 Rampur, Amawan, Raebareli district
 Rampur, Asoha, Unnao district
 Ramapur, Azamgarh district
 Rampur Baghel, Raebareli district
 Rampur Barara, Raebareli district
 Rampur Khurd, Raebareli district
 Rampur Sudauli, Raebareli district

Elsewhere in India 
 Rampur, Kamrup, Assam
 Rampur, Bihar
 Rampur Samastipur, Bihar
 Rampur (Chhattisgarh Vidhan Sabha constituency), Chhattisgarh
 Rampur, Kheda district, Gujarat
 Rampur, Himachal Pradesh
Rampur (Himachal Pradesh Assembly constituency)
 Rampur, Jharkhand
 Rampur, Karnataka
 Ramapur, Vijayapur Taluk, Bijapur district, Karnataka
 Rampur, Dahanu (census code 551582), Palghar district, Maharashtra
 Rampur, Dahanu (census code 551636), Palghar district, Maharashtra
 Rampur, Jalandhar, Punjab
 Rampur, SBS Nagar, Punjab

Nepal
 Rampur, Chitwan, Bagmati Pradesh
 Rampur, Dang, Lumbini Pradesh
 Rampur, Ramechhap, Bagmati Pradesh
 Rampur, Palpa, Lumbini Pradesh

Pakistan
 Rampur, Lahore, Punjab

People 
 Gurcharan Rampuri (1929–2018), Indian-born Canadian poet from Rampur, Ludhiana
 Baba Rampuri (born 1950), American ascetic, settled in Rampur, India

See also 
 Rampuri, Indian gravity knife from Rampur, Uttar Pradesh
 Rampuri cap, Indian hat from Rampur, Uttar Pradesh
 Rampur Baghelan, a town in Madhya Pradesh, India
 Rampur-Baghelan (Vidhan Sabha constituency)
 Rampur Birta (disambiguation)
 Rampura (disambiguation)
 Ramapuram (disambiguation)
 Ranpur (disambiguation)